Hayes Wendell Jones (born August 4, 1938) is an American former athlete, winner of the 110 m hurdles event at the 1964 Summer Olympics. He was born in Starkville, Mississippi.

Jones first major title was the  hurdles at the 1958 AAU championships. He won four more AAU titles: 1960 and 1964 in 110 m hurdles and 1961 and 1963 in  hurdles.

A year later, at the Rome Olympics he was third behind teammates Lee Calhoun and Willie May, after which many observers believed he had reached his peak performance. But he returned to the 1964 Olympic Games in Tokyo, where he won the gold medal and his teammate Blaine Lindgren won the silver. Jones also ran on a 4 × 100 m relay team that set a world record in 1961.

After retiring from competition, Jones became New York City's director of recreation in 1967. He has also worked in American Airlines and owned his own baggage check-in service at Detroit Metropolitan Airport.

Politics
From January 2005 through March 2006, Jones served as the director of the Oakland County Department of Economic Development & Community Affairs. In 2006 he left Oakland County to run for State Representative in Pontiac, Michigan to finish the term vacated by newly elected Pontiac Mayor Clarence Phillips and to win a full two-year term starting in January 2007. Jones was on the primary ballot twice; the first to finish the term left vacant by Phillips, and second, to be the Democratic candidate for the full two-year term in the general election. Oddly Jones won the right to be the Democratic candidate for the remainder of the two months left on Phillips' term while Tim Melton will be the Democratic candidate for the full two-year term.

On July 1, 2007 Jones assumed the position of General Manager of SMART (Suburban Mobility Authority for Regional Transportation), the public transit operator serving suburban Detroit, Michigan.

Personal life
In 2003 Jones married Rhonda, they live in Pontiac. Jones has two children and three grandchildren.

References

External links 
 

1938 births
Living people
African-American state legislators in Michigan
American male hurdlers
Athletes (track and field) at the 1959 Pan American Games
Athletes (track and field) at the 1960 Summer Olympics
Athletes (track and field) at the 1964 Summer Olympics
Olympic gold medalists for the United States in track and field
Olympic bronze medalists for the United States in track and field
Sportspeople from Starkville, Mississippi
Track and field athletes from Michigan
Track and field athletes from Mississippi
Sportspeople from Pontiac, Michigan
Eastern Michigan University alumni
American athlete-politicians
Eastern Michigan Eagles men's track and field athletes
Medalists at the 1964 Summer Olympics
Medalists at the 1960 Summer Olympics
Members of the Michigan House of Representatives
Pan American Games gold medalists for the United States
Pan American Games medalists in athletics (track and field)
Medalists at the 1959 Pan American Games
21st-century American politicians
21st-century African-American politicians
20th-century African-American people